

The following lists events that happened during 1976 in Afghanistan.

President Daud Khan pursues schemes of economic development and agricultural improvements with substantial aid from China, the U.S.S.R., Iran, and Kuwait, partly in the form of long-term loans and partly in technical aid.

Incumbents
 President: Mohammed Daoud Khan

April 1976
Floods and earthquakes devastate the provinces of Herat, Helmand, and Kandahar. Pakistan sends a message of sympathy and contributes substantially to relief operations, indicating a marked relaxation of the previously mounting tension between the two countries, largely due to persuasion by Pres. Nikolai Podgorny of the Soviet Union and the Shah of Iran. By mutual consent, both countries refrain from hostile propaganda.

June 7–11, 1976
Prime Minister Zulfikar Ali Bhutto of Pakistan visits Kabul. There, both countries undertake to follow principles of respect for territorial integrity and noninterference in internal affairs set forth by the 1955 Bandung Conference of Asian and African nations.

August 20–24, 1976
Daud Khan pays a return visit to Islamabad. He and Bhutto reach tentative agreement on a solution to the Pashtunistan problem.

End of November 1976
An attempted coup, instigated by discontented retired officers and led by a retired general, Mir Ahmad Shah, is discovered and some 50 persons are arrested.

 
Afghanistan
Years of the 20th century in Afghanistan
Afghanistan
1970s in Afghanistan